Proprioseiopsis amplus is a species of mite in the family Phytoseiidae.

References

amplus
Articles created by Qbugbot
Animals described in 1983